Eurycallinus unifasciatus is a species of beetle in the family Cerambycidae. It was described by Stephan von Breuning in 1947. It is known from Mexico.

References

Phacellini
Beetles described in 1947